Arhopala alax, the silky oakblue, (sometimes placed in Amblypodia) is a small butterfly found in India that belongs to the lycaenids or blues family.

Range
The butterfly has been found in India from Manipur onto Dawnas.

Status
William Harry Evans reported that the species was common in 1932.

See also
List of butterflies of India (Lycaenidae)

Cited references

References
  
 
 
 
 

Arhopala
Butterflies of Asia
Butterflies described in 1932
Taxa named by William Harry Evans